Recruited to Do Good Deeds for the Devil is the fifth album released by Kalamazoo-based progressive metal band Thought Industry. It is a compilation album featuring previously unreleased songs and live tracks.

Track listing
 "Hello, Lovey Dovey..." (Bryant) 0:38
 Love is America Spelled Backwards (Jim Grace Version) (Oberlin) 3:39
 Metal (Gary Numan) 3:43
 Get Up and Slumber (Oberlin) 5:30
 Famous Mistake (Live) (Oberlin, Enzio, Bryant, Ledbetter) 2:45
 Atomic Stroller Helps None (Lee, Oberlin) (Remix) 1:25
 Louisiana (Lee, Oberlin) 5:16
 Republicans in Love (Oberlin, Lee, Enzio, Donaldson) (Live) 4:34
 Cornerstone (Oberlin, Lee, Enzio, Donaldson) (Live) 3:30
 Encounter with a Hick (Oberlin, Lee, Enzio, Donaldson) 4:28
 The Squid (Oberlin) (Live) 4:00
 Earwig (Oberlin, Enzio, Bryant, Ledbetter) ("Say Amen" Remix) 5:14
 Whine (Oberlin, Enzio, Bryant, Ledbetter) 2:57
 Watercolour Grey (Oberlin) (Gordon Lightfoot Version) 5:58
 Gelatin (Oberlin, Enzio, Lee, Donaldson) (Live) 4:55
 Final Ballet (Oberlin, Lee, Donaldson, Spaeth) 1:01
 December 10 (Oberlin, Enzio, Bryant, Ledbetter) (Remix) 3:16
 Blue (Oberlin, Enzio, Bryant, Ledbetter) (Live) 3:17
 Love is America Spelled Backwards (Oberlin) (Live) 2:58
 nnnon (Oberlin, Enzio, Lee, Donaldson) 1:45

Personnel
Brent Oberlin - vocals, guitar, bass guitar on 3, 10 & 16
Paul Enzio - guitar
Herb Ledbetter - bass
Jared Bryant - drums
Christopher Lee - guitar on 3, 4, 6, 7, 10 & 16
Dustin Donaldson - drums on 3, 10, & 16
Produced by Thought Industry

References

Thought Industry albums
1998 compilation albums